"La differenza tra me e te" is a pop song written by Italian pop singer Tiziano Ferro. It was released as the first single from his fifth album L'amore è una cosa semplice (2011) and achieved success in Italy, where it was certified double platinum by the Federation of the Italian Music Industry, and in Belgium. A Spanish-language version of the song was also released. Titled "La diferencia entre tú y yo", it served as the first single from El amor es una cosa simple, the Spanish edition of Ferro's fifth studio album.

Track listing
 CD single (Italia)
"La differenza tra me e te"		

 CD single (Spain)
"La diferencia entre tú y yo"

 Digital download 
"La differenza tra me e te"	
"La diferencia entre tú y yo"

Charts

Weekly charts

Year-end charts

References

2011 singles
Italian-language songs
Tiziano Ferro songs
Songs written by Tiziano Ferro
2011 songs